WJTH AM 900 is a radio station broadcasting a country music format, and is licensed to serve Calhoun, Georgia, United States. The station is currently owned by Cherokee Broadcasting Company and features programming from USA Radio Network, GNN (Georgia News Network) and Motor Racing Network.  WJTH also transmits on W269CC FM 101.7 MHz as a broadcast translator. W269CC has nearby Adairsville (to the southwest) as its city of license, and previously relayed WTSH-FM 107.1 from Rockmart prior to that station's power increase.

WJTH uses a folded unipole antenna.

References

External links

JTH (AM)
Radio stations established in 1977
1977 establishments in Georgia (U.S. state)
Country radio stations in the United States